Okita Dam  is a gravity dam located in Miyazaki Prefecture in Japan. The dam is used for flood control. The catchment area of the dam is 8.8 km2. The dam impounds about 26  ha of land when full and can store 2750 thousand cubic meters of water. The construction of the dam was started on 1971 and completed in 2001.

See also
List of dams in Japan

References

Dams in Miyazaki Prefecture